Enteromius condei is a species of ray-finned fish in the genus Enteromius, endemic to Gabon.

Etymology
The fish is named in honor of zoologist Bruno Condé(fr) (1920-2004), the director of l’Aquarium de Nancy, who helped collect the type specimen.

References 

 

Endemic fauna of Gabon
Enteromius
Taxa named by Jacques Géry 
Fish described in 1982